G. Vivekanand, also known as G. Vivek Venkatswamy, is an Indian politician from Bharatiya Janata Party and former Member of Parliament in the 15th Lok Sabha. He represented Peddapalli parliamentary constituency.

On 9 August 2019 he joined in Bharatiya Janata Party.

Early life

Dr. Vivek venkatswamy is the youngest son of veteran Indian National Congress member and former Member of Parliament G. Venkat Swamy and Kalavathi. He did his schooling from Hyderabad Public School, Begumpet and did his medicine, M.B.B.S, from Osmania Medical College. He belongs to Mala community.

Career

G. Vivek was elected to the 15th Lok Sabha from Peddapalli Constituency, after his father did not run the election. He was a member of coal committee and steel committee. Formerly he is the adviser to the State Government of Telangana for Inter-State relations.

He is the Vice Chairman of Visaka industries. He runs popular 24/7 Telugu news channel V6 News and a Telugu daily news paper Velugu

President of the HCA 
He was appointed the president of the Hyderabad Cricket Association in 2017.  He was removed from the post in 2018 due to conflict of interest. He started Telangana T20 League was not recognized by BCCI.

Positions held
 Member of Parliament, 15th Lok Sabha
 Member, Committee on Coal and Steel
 Chairman, Confederation of Indian Industry (CII), A.P. Chapter, (2006–2007)
 Chairman, Manufacturers Association
 Dr Vivek is the promoter Vice Chairman of the Visaka Group Of Companies.

References

Official Website

Living people
India MPs 2009–2014
Telangana Rashtra Samithi politicians
Lok Sabha members from Andhra Pradesh
United Progressive Alliance candidates in the 2014 Indian general election
People from Karimnagar district
Bharatiya Janata Party politicians from Telangana
Indian National Congress politicians from Telangana
1957 births